is a Japanese actor and voice actor. He is affiliated with Mausu Promotion.

Biography
After graduating from Toho Gakuen College of Drama and Music, Terasoma joined Haiyuza Theatre Company. In 1984, he made his film debut in W's Tragedy. After that, he became a regular in films directed by Shinichiro Sawai, who took the megaphone for W's Tragedy, and Hiromichi Horikawa, whom he has known since high school, and is still active as a supporting actor in various dramas.

Currently, Terasoma is also active as a voice actor. His debut as the voice of Shadow Moon in 1987's Kamen Rider Black drew attention, but after that he did not have many voice acting roles except in tokusatsu dramas produced by Toei. It was not until 1999, when he left Haiyuza, that he began to do voice acting in earnest. He mainly dubbed Western movies, but has also appeared in anime and narration.

After working for Haiyuza Theatre Company and Office PSC, Terasoma has been affiliated with Mausu Promotion since 2003. The reason why he changed his stage name was because, "it would be better if it was easier to read" (since the character  was difficult to read). However, besides the voice-only appearances, he still uses the kanji spelling of his name.

Filmography

Television animation
2002
Tokyo Underground, Pyron

2003
D.N.Angel, Kosuke Niwa

2004
Inuyasha, Goryomaru
Kyo kara Maoh!, Adalbert von Grantz
Samurai Gun, Kaishuu Katsu
Samurai 7, Kambei Shimada
Phoenix, Yumihiko
Madlax, McRae
Yakitate!! Japan, Kawachi's Father

2005
Gallery Fake, Akio Kikushima (episode 29)
Negima! Magister Negi Magi, Eishun Konoe
Tsubasa: Reservoir Chronicle, Grosum

2006
Fist of the Blue Sky, Guang-Lin Pan
Ape Escape, Pipotron J
Tokko, Dr. Shiraishi
Naruto, Renga
Bartender, Kamishima's boss
Black Lagoon: The Second Barrage, Russel
Rakugo Tennyo Oyui, Hirakagenai

2007
Oh! Edo Rocket, Tenten
Kaze no Stigma, Juugo Kannagi
Shigurui: Death Frenzy, Jingorou Higaki
D.Gray-man, Vittorio
Devil May Cry, Isaac
Pokémon Mystery Dungeon: Explorers of Time and Darkness, Juputoru
Moonlight Mile, Kuramochi

2008
Gunslinger Girl: Il Teatrino, 2nd Section Chief Rorenfo
Kyo kara Maoh! 3rd Series, Adalbert von Grantz
Golgo 13, Bob Stigner
The Tower of Druaga: The Aegis of Uruk, Kelb
Naruto: Shippuden, Hidan
Pokémon: Diamond & Pearl, Cilent
Sands of Destruction, Rigolet

2009
Slap Up Party: Arad Senki, Jigheart
Inuyasha: The Final Act, Goryomaru (Ep. 1), Moryomaru
Guin Saga, Vanon
Sōten Kōro, Yuán Shào
The Tower of Druaga: the Sword of Uruk, Kelb
Fullmetal Alchemist: Brotherhood, Gertner, Yuriy Rockbell
Pocket Monsters: Diamond & Pearl, Handsome
Pokémon Mystery Dungeon: Toki to Yami o Meguru Saigo no Bōken, Juptile

2010
The Book of Bantorra, Makia Dexiart
Digimon Fusion, Knightmon
Rainbow - Nisha Rokubō no Shichinin, Aritou

2011
Un-Go, Jujirou Fuwa
Wolverine, Tesshin Asano
Steins;Gate, Yūgo Tennōji
Digimon Xros Wars: The Young Hunters Who Leapt Through Time, Knightmon
No. 6, Rikiga
Pretty Rhythm Aurora Dream, Steven Jounouchi
Pokémon: Black and White, Drayden
Last Exile: Fam, The Silver Wing, Gunner Leader, Olaf
One Piece, Caribou
Beyblade: Metal Masters, Coach Steel

2012
Sakamichi no Apollon, Kaoru's Father
Smile Precure!, Daigo Hino
Toriko, Midora
Naruto Spin-Off: Rock Lee & His Ninja Pals, Hidan
Haiyore! Nyaruko-san, Narrator

2013
Gifū Dōdō!! Kanetsugu to Keiji, Kenshin Uesugi
Attack on Titan, Petra's Father
Hajime no Ippo: Rising, Kazuo Makunouchi
Beast Saga, Wolfen
Vividred Operation, Kenjirō Isshiki
Brothers Conflict, Rintarō Hinata
BlazBlue Alter Memory, Jubei
Pokémon: Black and White: Rival Destinies, Handsome
Log Horizon, Roderick

2014
World Conquest Zvezda Plot, Man, Narrator
Laughing Under the Clouds, Kiyotsuna Sasaki
Fate/stay night: Unlimited Blade Works, Sōichirō Kuzuki
Log Horizon 2, Roderick

2015
Fafner in the Azure: -EXODUS-, Ian Kamp
Fairy Tail, Torafusa
Ushio and Tora, Kyōji Atsuzawa

2016
Macross Delta, Gramia Nerich Windermere
Tiger Mask W, Yuji Nagata

2017
Mahojin Guru Guru, Monku (Eps. 6, 8, 11, 12, 24)

2018
 Golden Kamuy, Kiroranke
 Modest Heroes, Toto

2019
 Revisions, Ryōhei Kuroiwa
 Afterlost, Keigo
 Demon Slayer: Kimetsu no Yaiba, Saburo

2020
 Japan Sinks: 2020, Kōichirō Mutō
 The Misfit of Demon King Academy, Eugo La Raviaz
 Wandering Witch: The Journey of Elaina, Emil's Father

2021
 Dragon Goes House-Hunting, Catoblepas
 The Aquatope on White Sand, Akira Hoshino
 Irina: The Vampire Cosmonaut, Lieutenant Victor

2022
 Shinobi no Ittoki, Hoō Ban

2023
 Chillin' in My 30s After Getting Fired from the Demon King's Army, Granbaza
 In/Spectre 2nd Season, Kouya Fujinuma

Original video animation (OVA)
Tsubasa Tokyo Revelations (2007), Fei Wong Reed
Imagin Anime (2008), Kintaros
Mobile Suit Gundam MS IGLOO 2: Gravity of the Battlefront (2008), Ben Barberry
Strike Witches: Operation Victory Arrow, Vol. 2 - Aegean Umi no Megami (2015), Erwin Rommel

Original net animation (ONA)
Star Wars: Visions - The Duel (2021), Ronin

Theatrical animation
Ghost in the Shell 2: Innocence (2004), Azuma
Dōbutsu no Mori (2006), Apollo
Fafner in the Azure: Heaven and Earth (2010), Ian Camp
Naruto the Movie: Blood Prison (2011), Mui
The Princess and the Pilot (2011), Diego del Moral
Naruto the Movie: Road to Ninja (2012), Hidan
Your Name (2016), Toshiki Miyamizu
Fate/stay night: Heaven's Feel (2017), Sōichirō Kuzuki
Modest Heroes (2018), Toto
Waka Okami wa Shōgakusei! (2018), Kōnosuke Minoda
Mobile Suit Gundam Narrative (2018)
Saga of Tanya the Evil: The Movie (2019), Jotuck Hofen
Kingdom of Gold, Kingdom of Water (2023), Oduni

Tokusatsu
Kamen Rider Black (1988), Shadow Moon (Eps. 35-51)
Kamen Rider Black: Terrifying! The Phantom House of Devil Pass (1988) 
Kamen Rider Black RX (1989), Shadow Moon (Ep. 22, 27)
Tokkei Winspector (1990) Takeda (ep. 14) (actor)
Chikyu Sentai Fiveman (1990), Condorgin (Ep. 5)
Choujin Sentai Jetman (1991),  Kyotarou Tatsumi (actor) (Ep. 8)
Tokkyuu Shirei Solbrain (1991), Cross 8000 (voice),  Ryūichi Takaoka (Eps. 34, 35, 40, 43, 51 - 53) (actor)
Tokusou Exceedraft (1992), Narrator (Eps. 21 - 49 (Voiced by Yoshinari Torii (Eps. 1 - 14), Akira Murayama (15 - 20))
Kyōryū Sentai Zyuranger (1992), Guardian Beast Saber Tiger, Dora Narcissus (Ep. 32)
Blue SWAT (1994), Gold Platinum (Eps. 23-51)
Kamen Rider Den-O (2007) Kintaros/K Ryoutarou/Kamen Rider Den-O Ax Form, Climax Form
Kamen Rider Den-O: I'm Born! (2007) Kintaros/K Ryoutarou/Kamen Rider Den-O Ax Form
Kamen Rider Den-O & Kiva: Climax Deka (2008) Kintaros/K Ryoutarou/Kamen Rider Den-O Ax Form, Climax Form
Saraba Kamen Rider Den-O: Final Countdown (2008) Kintaros/Kamen Rider Den-O Ax Form, Climax Form
Kamen Rider Decade (2009) Kintaros/K Tsukasa/K Natsumi/Kamen Rider Den-O Ax Form
Cho Kamen Rider Den-O & Decade Neo Generations: The Onigashima Warship (2009) Kintaros/K Ryoutarou/Kamen Rider Den-O Ax Form, Cho Climax Form/K Riki/Kamen Rider Caucasus (Kintaros)
Kamen Rider × Kamen Rider × Kamen Rider The Movie: Cho-Den-O Trilogy (2010) Kintaros/K Koutarou/Kamen Rider Den-O Ax Form, Climax Form/Kinta Ono
OOO, Den-O, All Riders: Let's Go Kamen Riders (2011) Kintaros, Shadow Moon
Kamen Rider × Super Sentai: Super Hero Taisen (2012) Kintaros/Kamen Rider Den-O Ax Form, Shadow Moon
Kamen Rider Kiva: King of the Castle in the Demon World (2008) Teacher (Cameo Role)
Kamen Rider × Super Sentai × Space Sheriff: Super Hero Taisen Z (2013) Shadow Moon
Ressha Sentai ToQger vs. Kyoryuger: The Movie (2015), Creator Devius
Shuriken Sentai Ninninger (2015), Youkai Yamabiko (Ep. 14)
Uchu Sentai Kyuranger (2017), Pega-san (Ep. 6, 44)
Kamen Rider × Super Sentai: Ultra Super Hero Taisen (2017) Kintaros
Kamen Rider Heisei Generations Forever (2018) Kintaros/Kamen Rider Den-O Ax Form
Kishiryu Sentai Ryusoulger (2019) Kishiryu Tyramigo/Kishiryu Ptyramigo (Voiced by Takeshi Kusao (Kishiryu Pterardon))
Kamen Rider Zi-O (2019) Kintaros/Kamen Rider Den-O Climax Form (Ep. 39 & 40)

Video games
 Glass Rose (2003), Hideo Yoshinodou
 Final Fantasy XII (2006), Vossler York Azelas
 Naruto: Shinobi Retsuden 3 (2006), Hidan
 Ar tonelico II (2007), Legris Branchesca
 BlazBlue (2008), Jubei
 Naruto Shippūden: Gekitou Ninja Taisen EX 3 (2008), Hidan
 Tenchu: Shadow Assassins (2008), Lord Gohda
 Steins;Gate (2009), Yūgo Tennōji
 Last Escort: Club Katze (2010), Ryusei
 Catherine (2011), Steve Delhom, Nergal
 Dragon Age II (2011), Anders
 Kamen Rider: Climax Heroes series, Kamen Rider Den-O Axe Form and Super Climax Form, Shadow Moon (in Climax Heroes Fourze) (2011)
 Bravely Default (2012), Erutus Profiteur
 Fire Emblem Awakening (2012), Basilio
 Xenoblade Chronicles X (2015), Boze
 Bravely Second (2015), Erutus Profiteur
 Breath of Fire 6 (2016), Fritz
 Mega Man 11 (2018), Pile Man (Impact Man), Chairman
 Fairy Fencer F (2013), Bahus
 Granblue Fantasy (2014), Geisenborger
 Ghost Recon Wildlands (2017), El Sueño
 For Honor (2017), The Warden
 Tokyo Afterschool Summoners (2017), Krampus
 Judgement (2018), Satoshi Shioya
 Samurai Shodown (2020), The Warden
 Star Ocean: The Divine Force (2022), Bohld’or il Weill

Drama CD
Ai no Kusabi (????), Alec
GetBackers (2003), Saichou Mumyouin

Dubbing roles

Live-action
Andy Lau
Dance of a Dream, Namson Lau
Infernal Affairs (2005 TV Tokyo edition), Lau Kin-ming
Infernal Affairs III (2013 BS Japan edition), Lau Kin-ming
A World Without Thieves, Wang Bo
A Battle of Wits, Ge Li
The Warlords, Zhao Erhu
The Great Wall, Wang
Campbell Scott
The Spanish Prisoner, Joe Ross
Saint Ralph, Father George Hibbert
The Exorcism of Emily Rose, Ethan Thomas
The Amazing Spider-Man, Richard Parker
The Amazing Spider-Man 2, Richard Parker
Goran Višnjić
ER, Dr. Luka Kovac (Season 6–)
Committed, Neil
Elektra, Mark Miller
Leverage, Damien Moreau
The Deep, Samson
Jim Caviezel
Frequency, John Francis "Johnny" Sullivan
Pay It Forward, Jerry
I Am David, Johannes
Déjà Vu, Carroll Oerstadt
Transit, Nate
Sol Kyung-gu
Jail Breakers, Jae-pil
Public Enemy, Kang Chul-jung
Silmido, Kang In-chan
Another Public Enemy, Kang Chul-jung
Michael Fassbender
Inglourious Basterds, Lieutenant Archie Hicox
Shame, Brandon Sullivan
The Snowman, Harry Hole
Eric Bana
Troy, Hector
The Time Traveler's Wife, Henry DeTamble
King Arthur: Legend of the Sword, Uther Pendragon
Sean Bean
Ronin, Spence
The Dark, James
Jupiter Ascending, Stinger Apini 
Julian McMahon
Fantastic Four, Victor von Doom / Doctor Doom
Fantastic Four: Rise of the Silver Surfer, Victor von Doom / Doctor Doom
Faces in the Crowd, Detective Sam Kerrest
 2 Fast 2 Furious, Carter Verone (Cole Hauser)
 300, Captain Artemis (Vincent Regan)
 Æon Flux, Trevor Goodchild (Marton Csokas)
 A.I. Artificial Intelligence, Henry Swinton (Sam Robards)
 Alice in Wonderland, Charles Kingsleigh (Marton Csokas)
 All About Eve (2000 TV Tokyo edition), Bill Sampson (Gary Merrill)
 American Horror Story: Murder House, Dr. Ben Harmon (Dylan McDermott)
 Any Day Now, Paul Fliger (Garret Dillahunt)
 As Far as My Feet Will Carry Me, Clemens Forell (Bernhard Bettermann)
 Batman Begins (2007 NTV edition), Thomas Wayne (Linus Roache)
 Batman Begins (2008 Fuji TV edition), Ra's al Ghul (Ken Watanabe)
 Behind Enemy Lines: Colombia, Alvaro Cardona (Yancey Arias)
 Black Dog (TV edition), Jack Crews (Patrick Swayze)
 Blade: Trinity, Hannibal King (Ryan Reynolds)
 Blindness, Doctor (Mark Ruffalo)
 Boardwalk Empire, Arnold Rothstein (Michael Stuhlbarg)
 Body of Lies, Hani Salaam (Mark Strong)
 Brain Games, Drew Brees
 Bulletproof Monk, The Nameless Monk (Chow Yun-fat)
 Capote, Jack Dunphy (Bruce Greenwood)
 Clash of the Titans (2012 TV Asahi edition), Acrisius (Jason Flemyng)
 Cold Case, Assistant D.A. Kite (Josh Hopkins)
 Contact (2001 TV Tokyo edition), Palmer Joss (Matthew McConaughey)
 The Da Vinci Code, Rémy Jean (Jean-Yves Berteloot)
 Diana, Hasnat Khan (Naveen Andrews)
 The Diving Bell and the Butterfly, Jean-Dominique Bauby (Mathieu Amalric)
 Dolphin Tale, Dr. Clay Haskett (Harry Connick, Jr.)
 Exit Wounds (2004 NTV edition), Latrell Walker / Leon Rollins (DMX)
 The Exorcist (2001 NTV edition), Father Damien Crow (Jason Miller)
 Flood, Rob Morrison (Robert Carlyle)
 The Foreigner, Jerome Van Aken (Harry Van Gorkum)
 The Forgotten, Ash Correll (Dominic West)
 Freddy vs. Jason (2005 TV Tokyo edition), Deputy Stubbs (Lochlyn Munro)
 From the Earth to the Moon, Host, Jean-Luc Despont (Tom Hanks)
 The Ghost Writer, Adam Peter Bennett Lang (Pierce Brosnan)
 The Girl with the Dragon Tattoo, Mikael Blomkvist (Daniel Craig)
 A Good Year, Max Skinner (Russell Crowe)
 The Great Gatsby, Tom Buchanan (Joel Edgerton)
 Green Book, Graham Kindell (Brian Stepanek)
 Green Lantern, Abin Sur (Temuera Morrison)
 Grey's Anatomy, Owen Hunt (Kevin McKidd)
 Hannibal Rising, Inspector Pascal Popil (Dominic West)
 High Noon (2021 Star Channel edition), (Gary Cooper)
 Hitman, Agent 47 (Timothy Olyphant)
 Hollow Man, Matthew Kensington (Josh Brolin)
 Home Alone 3 (2019 NTV edition), Peter Beaupre (Olek Krupa)
 The Hot Zone, Wade Carter (Liam Cunningham)
 House of the Dead 2, Ellis (Ed Quinn)
 I Am Number Four, Henri (Timothy Olyphant)
 The Imitation Game, Maj. Gen. Stewart Menzies (Mark Strong)
 Independence Day (1999 TV Asahi edition), Major Mitchell (Adam Baldwin)
 The Insider, Jeffrey Wigand (Russell Crowe)
 Insomnia, Walter Finch (Robin Williams)
 Into the Storm, Gary Morris (Richard Armitage)
 The Intruder, Charlie Peck (Dennis Quaid)
 Invincible, Dick Vermeil (Greg Kinnear)
 Kingdom Hospital, Peter Rickman) (Jack Coleman)
 The Leftovers, Kevin Garvey (Justin Theroux)
 Legion, Bob Hanson (Dennis Quaid)
 Let's Go to Prison, John Lyshitski (Dax Shepard)
 The Lord of the Rings: The Rings of Power, Pharazôn (Trystan Gravelle)
 Mad Dogs, Lex (Michael Imperioli)
 Maleficent, King Stefan (Sharlto Copley)
 Man of Steel, Colonel Nathan Hardy (Christopher Meloni)
 Marnie, Mark Rutland (Sean Connery)
 Melancholia, John (Kiefer Sutherland)
 The Memory Keeper's Daughter, Al (Hugh Thompson)
 The Mentalist, Walter Mashburn (Currie Graham)
 Miles Ahead, Harper Hamilton (Michael Stuhlbarg)
 The Mustang, Roman Coleman (Matthias Schoenaerts)
 My Sister's Keeper, Brian Fitzgerald (Jason Patric)
 Mystic River, Dave Boyle (Tim Robbins)
 Nim's Island, Alex Rover (Gerard Butler)
 The Nun, Father Burke (Demián Bichir)
 Ocean's Twelve (2007 NTV edition), Paul (Jeroen Willems)
 The Offer, Robert Evans (Matthew Goode)
 Old, Charles (Rufus Sewell)
 Pandorum, Lieutenant Peyton (Dennis Quaid)
 Piranha 3DD, David Hasselhoff
 The Practice, Alan Shore (James Spader)
 Prodigal Son, Gil Arroyo (Lou Diamond Phillips)
 Prometheus, Charlie Holloway (Logan Marshall-Green)
 Proof of Life, Dino (David Caruso)
 Purple Noon (2016 Star Channel edition), Inspector Riccordi (Erno Crisa)
 Rage, Paul Maguire (Nicolas Cage)
 REC, Manu (Ferrán Terraza)
 Red Sparrow, Ivan Vladimirovich Egorov (Matthias Schoenaerts)
 Redemption: The Stan Tookie Williams Story, Stanley Williams (Jamie Foxx)
 Resident Evil: Apocalypse, Carlos Oliveira (Oded Fehr)
 Resident Evil: Extinction, Carlos Oliveira (Oded Fehr)
 The Road, The Man (Viggo Mortensen)
 The Road Home, Luo Yusheng (Sun Honglei)
 Rogue One, Senator Bail Organa (Jimmy Smits)
 Roman Holiday (PDDVD edition), Joe (Gregory Peck)
 Rome, Titus Pullo (Ray Stevenson)
 Rules Don't Apply, Howard Hughes (Warren Beatty)
 Rush, Stirling Moss (Alistair Petrie)
 The Secret Life of Bees, T-Ray Owens (Paul Bettany)
 Secret Window, Ted Milner (Timothy Hutton)
 Shattered Glass, Charles Lane (Peter Sarsgaard)
 Shaun of the Dead, David (Dylan Moran)
 The Shield, David Aceveda (Benito Martinez)
 The Shipping News, Quoyle (Kevin Spacey)
 Somewhere in Time (2003 DVD edition), Richard Collier (Christopher Reeve)
 Spartacus (2015 Blu-Ray edition), Spartacus (Kirk Douglas)
 Star Wars: Episode II – Attack of the Clones, Senator Bail Organa (Jimmy Smits)
 Star Wars: Episode III – Revenge of the Sith, Senator Bail Organa (Jimmy Smits)
 Taken 3, Stuart St. John (Dougray Scott)
 Taxi (2008 Fuji TV edition), Agent Mullins (Christian Kane)
 The Three Musketeers, D'Artagnan's father (Dexter Fletcher)
 The Towering Inferno (2013 BS Japan edition), Doug Roberts (Paul Newman)
 This Means War, Karl Heinrich (Til Schweiger)
 Tristan & Isolde, Lord Mark of Cornwall (Rufus Sewell)
 Twin Peaks (2017), DEA Agent Denise Bryson (David Duchovny)
 Two Brothers, Aidan McCrory (Guy Pearce)
 Ugly Betty, Connor Owens (Grant Bowler)
 Unforgettable, Lt. Al Burns (Dylan Walsh)
 Unstoppable (2004), Peterson (Kim Coates)
 Unstoppable (2010), Judd Stewart (David Warshofsky)
 War of the Worlds, Harlan Ogilvy (Tim Robbins)
 When in Rome, Derek Hammond (Julian Stone)
 The White Countess, Matsuda (Hiroyuki Sanada)
 Windtalkers, Sergeant Peter "Ox" Anderson (Christian Slater)
 The World's Fastest Indian, Jim Moffet (Christopher Lawford)
 The Yellow Sea, Tae-won (Jo Sung-ha)

Animation
 Balto II: Wolf Quest, Balto
 Balto III: Wings of Change, Balto
 The Boondocks, White Shadow
 The Croods, Grug Crood
 The Croods: A New Age, Grug Crood
 Fantastic Mr. Fox, Mr. "Foxy" Fox
 Happy Feet, Memphis
 Lego Star Wars: The Padawan Menace, George Lucas
 Love, Death & Robots, Nigel
 RWBY, General James Ironwood
 Star Wars: The Clone Wars, Bail Prestor Organa
Star Wars: Rebels, Bail Prestor Organa
Josee, the Tiger and the Fish, Ishi

Live-action roles
 Tokkei Winspector (1990), Takeda (episode 14)
 Tokkyuu Shirei Solbrain (1991-1992), Ryuuichi Takaoka (episodes 34, 35, 40, 43 & 51-53)
 Choujin Sentai Jetman (1991), Kyoutarou Tatsumi (episode 8)
 Aoi Tokugawa Sandai (2000), Itakura Shigemasa
 Kamen Rider Agito (2001), Ryuuji Tsukasa (actor) (Ep. 18 & 19)
 Kamen Rider Kiva: King of the Castle in the Demon World (2008), Teacher

References

External links
 
 
 

1962 births
Living people
Japanese male film actors
Japanese male television actors
Japanese male video game actors
Japanese male voice actors
Male actors from Osaka Prefecture
Male voice actors from Osaka Prefecture
People from Nishinomiya
20th-century Japanese male actors
21st-century Japanese male actors
Mausu Promotion voice actors